Medge Hall Halt was a small railway station in Lincolnshire, on the Doncaster to Cleethorpes Line, close to the border with Yorkshire. It served the local Medge Hall. The station was opened by the South Yorkshire Railway in September 1859. It closed in 1960, though the line it stood on is still open.

References

Disused railway stations in the Borough of North Lincolnshire
Former South Yorkshire Railway stations
Railway stations in Great Britain opened in 1859
Railway stations in Great Britain closed in 1960